SPDP can stand for
 Somali People's Democratic Party, a political party in Ethiopia
 Sarawak Progressive Democratic Party, a political party in Malaysia
 a colloquial term for Sev-Potato-Dahi-Puri, see Dahi puri.